General elections were held in Honduras on 28 October 1932. Voters went to the polls to elect a new President of the Republic and a new Congress.

"President Vicente Mejía Colindres resisted pressure from his own party to manipulate the results to favor the Liberal Party of Honduras candidate, Angel Zúñiga Huete.  As a result, the National Party of Honduras candidate, Tiburcio Carías Andino, won the election by a margin of some 20,000 votes".

Results

President

Congress

References

Bibliography
Argueta, Mario.  Tiburcio Carías: anatomía de una época, 1923-1948.  Tegucigalpa: Editorial Guaymuras. 1989.  
Argueta, Mario.  “El ascenso de Tiburcio Carías Andino.”  Revista política de Honduras 4:77-121 (April 1999). 1999.
Bardales B., Rafael. Historia del Partido Nacional de Honduras. Tegucigalpa: Servicopiax Editores. 1980.
Dodd, Thomas JTiburcio Carías:  portrait of a Honduran political leader.  Baton Rouge:  Louisiana State University Press. .  2005.  
Elections in the Americas A Data Handbook Volume 1. North America, Central America, and the Caribbean. Edited by Dieter Nohlen. 2005.
Euraque, Darío A. Reinterpreting the banana republic: region and state in Honduras, 1870-1972. Chapel Hill: The University of North Carolina Press. 1996.
Haggerty, Richard and Richard Millet.  “Historical setting.”  Merrill, Tim L., ed.  1995.  Honduras: a country study.  Washington, D.C.:  Federal Research Division, Library of Congress.
Krehm, William.  Democracia y tiranias en el Caribe.  Buenos Aires: Editorial Parnaso.  (First edition in 1947). 1957.  
Leonard, Thomas M.  “The quest for Central American democracy since 1945.”  Assessing democracy in Latin America.  1998.  Boulder: Westview Press.
Mahoney, James.  The legacies of liberalism:  path dependence and political regimes in Central America.  Baltimore:  Johns Hopkins University Press. 2001.  
Morris, James A. Honduras: caudillo politics and military rulers.  Boulder: Westview Press. 1984.  
Morris, James A. “Honduras: the burden of survival in Central America.”    Central America: crisis and adaptation.  1984.  Albuquerque: University of New Mexico Press.
Political handbook of the world 1934. New York, 1935.
Posas, Mario and Rafael del Cid. La construcción del sector público y del estado nacional en Honduras (1876-1979). San José: EDUCA. Second edition. 1983.
Stokes, William S.  Honduras: an area study in government.  Madison: University of Wisconsin Press. 1950.  
Weaver, Frederick Stirton. Inside the volcano: the history and political economy of Central America. Boulder: Westview Press. 1994. 

Elections in Honduras
Honduras
1932 in Honduras
Presidential elections in Honduras
October 1932 events
Election and referendum articles with incomplete results